Christopher Francis Haughey, nicknamed "Bud" (born October 3, 1925), is a former Major League Baseball pitcher who appeared in one game for the Brooklyn Dodgers in 1943. He was born in Astoria, New York.

Haughey is one of many ballplayers who only appeared in the major leagues during World War II. His major league debut happened to be on his 18th birthday, and it was the last game of the season. He pitched seven innings of relief against the Cincinnati Reds at Crosley Field, giving up five hits, ten walks, and six runs (three earned) in a 6–1 loss. Johnny Vander Meer was the winning pitcher. His career ended with a 0–1 record and a 3.86 ERA. Five other players made their Major League debut on the same day, October 3, 1943, as Haughey: Norm Brown, Hank Camelli, Cookie Cuccurullo, Gil Hodges, and Tony Ordenana.

After losing two seasons to the war in 1944–45, Haughey played in the minor leagues for five seasons through 1950, winning fifteen games for the St. Joseph Cardinals of the Class C Western Association in 1947. Haughey is the last living major league baseball player from the 1943 season.

References

External links 

1925 births
Living people
Major League Baseball pitchers
Baseball players from New York (state)
Brooklyn Dodgers players
Fordham Rams baseball players
St. John's Red Storm baseball players
Zanesville Dodgers players
Asheville Tourists players
Cambridge Dodgers players
St. Joseph Cardinals players
Allentown Cardinals players
Bridgeport Bees players